is a JR West Kure Line station located in Higashihiroshima, Hiroshima Prefecture, Japan. Akitsu Station has two sets of tracks and side platforms.

Akitsu Station started its operation on February 17, 1935. At this time this station was known as  but on November 20, 1949, this station was renamed to Akitsu Station.

Structure
Akitsu Station has two ground-level side platforms, connected by an underpass. The station is a Kan'i itaku station.

External links 
  Akitsu Station (JR West)

Kure Line
Railway stations in Hiroshima Prefecture
Railway stations in Japan opened in 1935
Stations of West Japan Railway Company